Moustapha Kourouma (born October 11, 1977 in Abidjan) is a Burkinabé footballer.

Career 
Kourouma was transferred in January 2007 from AS Mangasport to Issia Wazi, and played with Wazi at the CAF Confederations Cup.

International career 
He was a member of the Burkina Faso national football team.

References 

1977 births
Living people
Burkinabé footballers
Burkina Faso international footballers
Association football forwards
AS Mangasport players
Expatriate footballers in Gabon
Expatriate footballers in Qatar
Ivorian emigrants to Burkina Faso
Stella Club d'Adjamé players
Qatar SC players
Burkinabé expatriate sportspeople in Gabon
Burkinabé expatriate sportspeople in Qatar
Ivorian footballers
Footballers from Abidjan
Ivorian expatriate footballers
Ivorian expatriate sportspeople in Gabon
Ivorian expatriate sportspeople in Qatar
Issia Wazy players
21st-century Burkinabé people